The 2006 Big League World Series took place from July 29-August 5 in Easley, South Carolina, United States. Thousand Oaks,  California defeated San Juan,  Puerto Rico in the championship game.

Teams

Results

Group A

Group B

Elimination Round

References

Big League World Series
Big League World Series